San Enrique, officially the Municipality of San Enrique,  is a 3rd class municipality in the province of Iloilo, Philippines. According to the 2020 census, it has a population of 36,911 people.

Geography

Geographic Location

San Enrique is located in the central part of the province of Iloilo,  from the provincial capital, Iloilo City. It is bounded by scenic Mounts Bayoso, Cañapasan, Agcarope, and Puti-an, where crystal clear waters from natural spring provide the population with an abundant source of drinking water. San Enrique is noted for its fertile valleys, green and verdant meadows were once grazed in abundance herds of cattle. Now, these fields are filled with luxuriant sugarcane plantations.

San Enrique has a total land area of 11,728.04 hectares, comprising 28 barangays, based on the data from the Land Management Bureau. It is bounded on the north by the City of Passi, on the south by the town of Dingle, on the east by the towns of Banate and Barotac Viejo, and on the west by the town of Dueñas separated by the Jalaur River.

Land use
Out of the total land area of 8,772 hectares; 7572 hectares is devoted to Agriculture; 33.34 hectares in Industrial; 12 hectares in Commercial; 86 hectares in residential; 25 hectares in Institutional and 1,043.66 hectares in forest, rivers, marsh and swamps.

Topography and Slope
There are six mountains range that landmark the topography of this municipality:

Mt. Cañapasan 
Mt. Bayoso 
Mt. Gepiz 
Mt. Cararapan 
Mt. Cabas-an 
Mt. Puti-an

Standing on their own right, the queen of these mountains is Mount Cañapasan, which is noted for its panoramic surrounding area. Its highest skyline makes a vertical lift of 569 meters sea level. The second highest mountain is Mt. Bayoso with 405 meters above sea level. Located in the eastern part of the Poblacion, the grandeur and splendor of its crest is the seat of the towering RCPI, SMART, PLDT, and other relay stations.

Besides the small mountain ranges mentioned above, hilly to rolling is the several slopes of the land. With slightly rolling and marginal flat land that blighted its landscape, this is utilized for lowland farming.

San Enrique is generally flat while some portions are hilly and rolling with the highest elevation of 560 meters above sea level. The dominant slope of the area ranges from 8-18% occupying an area of approximately 7,707.45 hectares (70.10%) while 1,284.56 hectares (11%) have a slope of 0-8%. A large portion of the town is quite flat and suitable for lowland farming, its dominant slope occupying a large area is advantage potential for the municipality to be an agricultural town.

Hydrology

There are also three major rivers passing through the municipality, the Jalaur River, Abaca River and Asisig River. Jalaur River is considered as one of the biggest river in Panay that directly empties in Iloilo Strait. These rivers are major source of water for domestic and irrigation purposes. There are also several creeks that traverse the municipality namely the Dumiles Creek, Hinayan Creek and Agutayan Creek.

Mount Cabas-an is a major water resource with the presence of many springs in the area. Talinab Spring located in Barangay Lip-ac, in the lower portion of Mount Cabas-an supplies water in the Poblacion.

Soil types
There are eight soil types present in the municipality and these are good for farming.  These are the following:

Drainage

The existing drainage system in the municipality relies on the natural elevations and layout of the land. Roads are also provided with canals for drainage. The urban center of the municipality is slightly higher than other areas but it was also flooded by the highest point of the floodwaters during the Typhoons Yolanda, Quinta, and Frank when the public market was reached.

While the existing natural and man-made drainage may be adequate during normal rainfalls and low-intensity typhoons, there is a need to establish a drainage system that will sufficiently drain excess water from the Poblacion and other critical areas, especially during floods and heavy rainfalls. Roads have to be made passable even during the worst of the flooding.

Climate

Barangays
The Municipality is composed of twenty-eight barangays. There are two urban barangays namely Poblacion Ilawod and Poblacion Ilaya and the remaining twenty-six barangays are rural barangays. Of the twenty-eight barangays, the largest in terms of the land area in Barangay San Antonio which is 1,347.1972 hectares and the smallest is Barangay Poblacion Ilawod which is 50.3144 hectares.

 Abaca - 704.08 hectares
 Asisig - 202.80 hectares
 Bantayan - 248.19 hectares
 Braulan - 572.89 hectares
 Cabugao Nuevo - 51.74 hectares
 Cabugao Viejo - 180.84 hectares
 Camiri - 275.61 hectares
 Catan-agan - 1,010.76 hectares
 Compo - 311.42 hectares
 Cubay - 578.89 hectares
 Dacal - 319.14 hectares
 Dumiles - 550.95 hectares
 Garita - 611.43 hectares
 Gines Nuevo - 267.53 hectares
 Imbang Pequeño - 188.81 hectares
 Imbesad-an - 157.58 hectares
 Iprog - 786.80 hectares
 Lip-ac - 179.01 hectares
 Madarag - 951.29 hectares
 Mapili - 862.70 hectares
 Paga - 340.74 hectares
 Palje - 144.74 hectares
 Poblacion Ilawod - 50.31 hectares
 Poblacion Ilaya - 79.01 hectares
 Quinolpan - 500.00 hectares
 Rumagayray - 135.97 hectares
 San Antonio - 1,347.20 hectares
 Tambunac - 117.62 hectares

History

The Early San Enriquenhons
The earliest inhabitants of San Enrique may be traced back to the tribes of the great Datus who had moved up the river Jalaud and settled on a promontory they called “Bontoc” near the eastern banks where they tilled land and practiced farming and animal husbandry for a self-sustaining economy. Following their customs and united by the bonds of kinship they built a community.

Out of that flourishing settlement later rose great men like Manuel Paez, Modesto Palabrica, and Apolinario Palabrica, who had earlier become Capitanes of the mother town of Passi, Iloilo. The names of Santiago Pama, Augusto Palencia, Gregorio Aguilar, Bartolo Garrido, Cipriano Gonzales, Vicente Quinzon, and others surnamed Palabrica and Paez, had been elected to the position of Capitanes or Tenientes. Other men Simon Padios and Florencio Villalobos emerged as leaders and followed the footstep of their forebears in the long journey to progress.

Founding the Pueblo and Ecclesia
The history of San Enrique had been largely set up by geography. High-rise mountains gave origins to the river Asisig and Agutayan whose water meet and collide in confluence with the water of powerful Jala-ud which marks the southeastern boundaries of the town. Torrential rains in the past brought about by erratic atmospheric changes caused heavy flooding that rendered roads impassable. Often it leaves Bontoc isolated for days, even weeks from the Pueblo of Passi, depriving the inhabitants of the much needed civil and ecclesiastical services. The situation prompted the leaders of Bontoc to send a seven-page petition. Expediente de 1877, urging the politico-military governor, Don Enrique Fajardo y Garcia to support their bid to establish an independent pueblo from the mother town. After twenty-two endorsements from several colonial offices, the petition was approved by the Ministro de Ultramar and later confirmed by a Royal Order from the Spanish King.

In recognition of the patronizing efforts of the Governor, a grateful people named the town after him and further added a celestial fervor to this act of gratitude by putting the halo of a saint before the name of a benefactor.

The founding of the parish was surrounded and shrouded with the aura of conflict and drama. Unlike the pueblo, the parish was born out of protest against the creeping anti-clericalism of liberal Spaniards coming from Spain who was pestering the parishes like flies during the summer months. To defend his flock an equally zealous friar curate rallied them under the protective mantle of catholic tradition and moved his church to Abaca, one and a half league away from the town of Passi.

With reconciliation coming after, the church in Abaca remained as a chaplaincy of the mother parish of Passi. But when the pueblo de San Enrique was established by virtue of a Real Orden from King Alfonso XII (1874-1885) in 1879, the church at Abaca was fused with the town in pursuance to the requirements of one town and one church policy during the colonial times. Thus, the parish of Auxilium Christianorum can tell of its unique origin as an ecclesia that had antedated by more than half a century the founding of its counterpart, the pueblo.

Pre-dominant Religion
To this day, Catholicism implanted by the early Spanish missionaries remains the dominant religion of San Enriquenhons. More than ninety percent of the population are Catholics and there are no reliable statistical indications that their number would lessen in the future.

Their faith went through difficult and trying times. After the war, there was a revival and renewal of commitment to the faith of their forebears as shown by the emergence of different organizations and councils that like in the past combined the zeal of worship with the energies of civility.

Modern evangelizing techniques have largely superseded the role of Catechism in strengthening the faith of the people. Whether it is the imposing majority of Catholic rituals or the real inspiration of its doctrine that drives throngs of churchgoers during Sunday masses and Lenten services, the high place of Catholicism in their hearts and minds can be safely assured.

The American Era
The American occupation of the islands brought numerous changes in the course of the history of San Enrique. The title of Capitan was changed to Presidente, to suggest a civilian tone to marshal government. The first elected Presidente in 1902 was Quiterio Paez, whose term was cut short when he died a year after. But the growing clamor among Filipino national leaders for immediate independence forced the American civil administration to fuse towns into municipal districts in preparation for the election of deputies to the Philippine Assembly in 1907. San Enrique was fused with Passi along with Dueñas and Calinog. However, the creation of an all Filipino legislature as provided by the Jones Law of 1916, gave way for individual towns, to break away from the fusion and regain their original townhood. Dueňas regained her independence in 1916 and Calinog followed in 1921. San Enrique, whether for lack of hindsight or mere complacency, remained content with the status of arrabal or suburb of Passi for more than five decades in anticipation of a new leader who would provide the impetus for writing another chapter of its contemporary history.

The Restoration
Half-century was a long interlude for the next act in the dramatic history of San Enrique. Five decades had created a leadership vacuum calling for someone with a crusading spirit to spearhead a movement for second emancipation. The need for a leader as well as the rising expectations ushered by the post war years brought to the political scene the person of Jesus Palmerola Prudente, a charismatic leader who provided the vision towards the historic restoration of the original independent townhood of San Enrique.

When news about the plan to bring San Enrique back to its original independence reached the population they were overjoyed. Prudente was looked up to by the people as a modern Messiah who would lead them to freedom.

During an exploratory talk held at the house of his aunt, Maura Ponte in Barangay Camiri, Prudente and his closest friends stressed the need to launch a movement aimed at separating San Enrique from Passi. This was followed by a core group meeting at the old municipal building in the presence of Ernesto Palabrica, Jose Lacsao, Crispin Lademora, and Rodrigo Ponte, he laid down the mechanics for the reconstitution of the town into a separate political entity.

At the Assembly Meeting called on November 25, 1956, a big crowd clustered in the market place at the corner of Palabrica and Manolo Paez Streets. In his stirring speech, Dr. Zosimo Palencia, then number one Councilor of Passi assured them of his wholehearted support. Other impassioned speakers were Exequiel Garrido, Jesus Paclibar, Juan Ayupan, Ernesto Palabrica, Genaro Aguilar, and Manuel P. Pama. Also noteworthy was the participation of the San Enrique Youth Association (SEYA), which intensified the fervor of the movement.

Convinced that the great gathering was a reflection of the real sentiments of the people, the grand old man of Passi, Mayor Filoteo Palmares, Sr. listened to Councilors Prudente and Palencia and gave the movement its desired momentum.

The young professionals of San Enrique also got down to work. Joining Prudente's crusade was a young and energetic Engr. Romulo Von Lallab, Judge Mariano Basa and Luis Barrido. They prepared the documents and other requirements for the formal launching of the movement. The older San Enriquenhons did not lack enthusiasm as well. Drawing inspiration from Exequiel Garrido, Jesus Paclibar, Atty. Manual A. Pama, his younger brother Rafael and Pedro Fernandez, Rodrigo Ponte did the research for the needed data to complete the reconstitution documents. The papers were hand-carried by Congressman Jose Aldeguerto Malacañang.

On July 12, 1957, President Carlos P. Garcia signed Executive Order No. 259-S-1957 - “Creating the Municipality of San Enrique in the Province of Iloilo.”

The first set of municipal officials were appointed, with Jesus Prudente as Mayor and Manuel P. Pama as Vice-Mayor. Appointed councilors were Vicente Lallen, Concepcion L. Fernandez, Olando L. Pama and Genaro Aguilar. The latter resigned, however, and was succeeded by Carlos Poblador. Salvador Garrido was the Municipal Secretary, Jose Lacsao, Treasurer and Perfecto Lademora, Chief of Police.

In the first election of municipal officials in November 1959, Jesus P. Prudente was elected Mayor with Carlos Poblador as Vice Mayor. The first elected councilors in the rank order were Rodrigo Ponte, Francisco Oro, Erlinda Garrido, Clemente Palmes, Melecio Aricaya, and Luis Barrido.

Contemporary San Enrique
San Enrique today may have little likeness with the distant past. Although the landforms, rich natural resources, and the indomitable spirit of its people remain unaltered, the wings of progress have finally carried with it modern ways and lifestyles. Proud of their past, the modern San Enriquenhons have become even more confident and determined to face the challenges of the future, the transformation of the town into a functional community has been greatly aided by the institutions of education, religion, and industry that had taken roots in the town. These institutions have a great share in the empowerment of the people, particularly the youth sector and have propelled them to work and seek opportunities where they are at hand. But the goals that will move the new generation to act in the line set by their predecessors will largely be determined by the dynamics of change.

Demographics

In the 1995 National Census, it had a registered total household population of 25,572, an increase of 875 over the 1990 total population of 24,697.

Aside from the prevailing inhabitants of this municipality, the transient ethnic groups that frequent this place belongs to the cultural minority, the Aetas or Negriteos. They are seasonally around during the planting and harvesting of sugarcane.

Employment
Out of 8, 246.99 hectares of total agricultural land area, almost 90% are the owner-cultivator and 10% are leaseholders. For the agricultural land area (rice, corn, sugarcane) major crop of the municipality, almost all of them are distributed to the beneficiary through CARP.

In crop production, farm laborers play key roles in every aspect.  For the least area coverage of 1 hectare, mostly farm laborers are members of the family households. Based on Population Commission (PopCom) data of 2011, farming and farm laborer having 21% both male and female (male-2,665, female-529) have a total of 15,280 labor forces. The average number of man-days per hectare every cropping for palay is 60, for sugarcane 150 and 30 for corn. 2015 record shows that palay farming constitutes the greatest number of farmworkers among the industry group. For the baseline data (the year 2016) LGU Net Revenue with a total of Php12, 116,919.17 with Php 3,595,677.00, or 30.56% came from the agriculture sector. But data based on the year 2015, it was observed that net revenue in the agricultural sector decreased from 2014 with Php 1,183,784.10 to 2015 with Php 721,495.29 for about 60.94%. The increase in the net revenue in the year 2014 was due to tax amnesty.

Generally, the majority of the people of San Enriquenhon are engaged in rice farming due to the largely agricultural area of the town.  Some are engaged in livelihood activities such as poultry and livestock raising.  Others are engaged in agri-industrial activities.  Many others are employed in the government and privately owned offices especially professionals in the community.  There are others who tried to work abroad no matter what kind of job offered to earn a better income to sustain the needs of their family.  Based on the 2010 primary survey, in the last five years, there were 1,320 family members working abroad.  In year 2006 there were only 165; 2007 - 180; 2008 – 250; 2009 – 360; and 2010 – 365.  This indicates that they prefer to work abroad for a greener pasture.

Housing
Based on the 2015 PSA data, the total number of households is 7,638 with an average household size of 4.5. The total number of housing units is 5,426.
In terms of the type of building materials of the roof and outer walls, a total of 2,237 housing units or 41.23% are made of concrete/ bricks/ stone,  497 or 9.16% are made of wood, 681 or 12.55% are made of half concrete/ bricks/ stone and half wood, 43 or 0.79% are made of galvanized iron/aluminum, 1,948 or 35.90% are made of bamboo/ sawali/ cogon/ nipa, 2 are made of asbestos and 1 is made of glass and 9 are barong-barong or makeshift. There are 6 housing units that use materials other than mentioned and 2 are not reported. (Based on NSO data, 2010)

On tenure status of the lot, 2,477 or 45.65% owned/ amortized the house, 162 or 2.99% are being rented, 2,211 or 40.75% are being occupied for free with the consent of the owner, 136 or 2.51% are being occupied for free without consent of owner, 67 or 1.23% are not applicable and 373 or 6.87% are not reported.

Economy 

Major industry
The municipality of San Enrique is largely agricultural and majority of the population is engaged in farming. Social and economic undertaking of the town is centered on agriculture.

Mining
San Enrique has non-metallic mineral resources located at Barangay Camiri and Rumagayray. So its resource potentials have no mineral reserves, mineral production and claimed mine land.

Despite the presence of non-metallic minerals like limestone in Rumagayray, some private individual is engaged in processing and a production of limestone. Yearly production of hydrated lime is very small in volume because limes produced only by using the crude of "Tutod" method and cannot compete with the others like in Guimaras Island. In Barangay Camiri there's also a non-metallic mineral resource for use in the making of pots, jars, etc. They used clay soil.

Tourism
Festivals and fiestas
Every 24 May, the Municipality of San Enrique celebrates its Municipal Patronal Fiesta and Corn Festival on the Second week of August.

Every 2nd Sunday of July, the Municipality of San Enrique celebrates Kalamay Festival
Man-made attractions

The transmitters of RCPI, PLDT, SMART and other relay stations located at the peak of Mount Cañapasan. 
The Passi sugar (ILOILO) Sugar Central, Inc. in Barangay Imbang Pequeño, San Enrique, Iloilo.

Mini Park in Poblacion

Existing tourism - related projects

Mount Puti-an, known with caves which is located at Barangay Rumagayray and Bulabog Putian National Park situated at the boundary of Dingle and San Enrique.

Proposed tourism development projects

Mount Cañapasan, which has a panoramic surrounding area and the Talinab Spring at Barangay Lip-ac, which is the source of water, supply in the Poblacion.

Government

Elected officials
The current elected Municipal Officials of the Municipality of San Enrique are the following:

Mayor: Rosario Mediatrix P. Fernandez

Vice Mayor: Ernesto P. Palomado

Sangguniang Bayan Members:
 Atty. Precious Grace S. Panizales
 Deza P. Pamposa
 Jose P. Fernandez Jr.
 Edmundo P. Palomado
 Ariel T. Buyco
 Susan A. Villalobos
 Julius P. Paclibar
 Leslie S. Labos
 Domingo L. Alarba (Liga President/ Ex-Officio SB Member)
 Ma. Lie P. Labos (SKMF President/ Ex-Officio SB Member)

Source:https://halalanresults.abs-cbn.com/local/iloilo/san-enrique

List of former Municipal Mayors & Vice Mayors

Infrastructure

Road and bridges 
The type of existing roads in the municipality is the National Roads, Provincial Roads and the Municipal Roads. The National Roads are the San Enrique-San Rafael Road, the San Enrique-Garita Road and the San Enrique-Dingle Road, the San Enrique-Dueñas Road and the KABASAKA Road. The Municipal Roads consist of Municipal Streets and the Barangay Roads.

There are six major bridges and considerable meterage of overflows and box culverts. The different concrete bridges are located in different barangays. Asisig bridge at Barangay Asisig with a total length of 45 LM. The bridge located in Imbesad-an is measured approximately 30 LM in length. Lictinon bridge at Barangay Catan-agan is approximately 39 LM. Rumagayray Bridge is measured roughly about 30 LM in length and Cabit Bridge in Paga with a length of 25 LM.

Since numerous shallow creeks in addition to bridges traverse the land surface of the town, overflows are constructed to supplement the road network. These overflows are usually a fill-up of boulders amalgamated with concrete and supplemented with reinforced concrete pipes serving as water under passage. During floods, water just overflow, since flooding of this creeks or rivers is usually of short duration, suspension of traffic during floods along these overflows is very temporary.

Some of the overflows can be found at Barangay Abaca, Barangay Cubay and Barangay Lip-ac-Palje.

Healthcare
Health Clinics - 2 
Barangay Health Stations - 6 (Cubay, Madarag, Quinolpan and Catan-agan)

Education
College
San Enrique has one tertiary school:
ISCOF-SEC - Iloilo State College of Fisheries - San Enrique Campus
Secondary Schools
San Enrique has four Public High schools:
SENCHS - San Enrique National Comprehensive National High School
VANHS - Vicente Aguilar National High School
DAMNHS - Dominador Abang Memorial National High School
SEMPNHS - San Enrique Manuel Paluay National High School
Elementary Schools

San Enrique has twenty (20) elementary schools and four(4) primary schools

Private Schools

San Enrique has two private schools
St. Therese Learning Center (Poblacion Ilaya)
San Enrique Baptist Kindergarten School (Poblacion Ilawod)

References

External links
 [ Philippine Standard Geographic Code]
 Philippine Census Information
 Local Governance Performance Management System

 2022 National and Local Elections Halalan Result

Municipalities of Iloilo
Establishments by Philippine executive order